Udhayabhanu Maheswaran (born February 21 1970), known by his stage name Udhay Mahesh, is an Indian actor and director. He directed two Tamil films: Naalai (2006) and Chakkara Viyugam (2008). As an actor, he is best known for his portrayal of Vishwanathan in the STAR Vijay series Office. His portrayal of the character Chellam in The Family Man received social media attention and acclaim.

Career
Udhayabhanu made his directorial debut with Naalai starring Richard Rishi and Madhumitha, film introduced cinematographer Natarajan Subramaniam as an actor. The film, a gangster subject was released in 2006 to mixed reviews
and became average grosser. He again directed Natraj in Chakkara Viyugam, a crime thriller which was completely shot around Kolkata. The film was briefly delayed due to Natrajan's cameraman assignments and also crew complained the behaviour of film's actress Daisy Bopanna. The film was released in 2008 to mixed reviews.

As an actor, he played a small role in critically acclaimed Moodar Koodam. His portrayal of IT company Country Head Vishwanathan in STAR Vijay series Office had received critical acclaim and gained accolades from audience.

Filmography

As director

As writer only
Yahaan (2005) (Hindi)
Abhiyum Anuvum (2018) (Tamil)

As actor

Web series
The Family Man (2021) as Chellam
Farzi (2023) as Chellam (cameo appearance)

Television
Agni Paravai
Office - Vishwanathan
Pagal Nilavu: Andal Azhagar Adutha Thalaimurai- Sakthivel
Mouna Raagam (TV Series)-'' Manohar

References

External links
 Uday Mahesh on Facebook
 Uday Mahesh on Twitter

Tamil film directors
Male actors in Tamil cinema
Film directors from Tamil Nadu
Living people
21st-century Indian male actors
Male actors from Tamil Nadu
1972 births